Panapur is a village in Bihar, India. Panapur has also police station. Panapur is located from 20 km from its district Muzaffarpur. This village has good connectivity with road NH 28 and railway. Nearest railway station is Piprahan.
Nearby villages of this village with distance are  Kanti (6 km), Motipur(10 km).

Panapur Pin Code is 843109. There is a famous temple in this village named Maa bhasmi devi. This is ancient and famous temple in bihar.

Schools nearby Panapur

Chandrasheel Vidyapeeth

R C High school Birpur
	DAV Public School, Kanti

 Uchh madhyamik vidyalaya panapur.
 Primary school panapur banglatola.

Villages in Muzaffarpur district